1784 Benguella, provisional designation , is a background asteroid from the inner regions of the asteroid belt, approximately  in diameter. It was discovered by South African astronomer Cyril Jackson at the Johannesburg Observatory on 30 June 1935. It was named for the city of Benguela in Angola. The low-numbered asteroid has been studied poorly.

Orbit and classification 

According to modern HCM-analyses, Benguella is a non-family asteroid from the main belt's background population. It orbits the Sun in the inner asteroid belt at a distance of 2.1–2.7 AU once every 3 years and 9 months (1,362 days; semi-major axis of 2.41 AU). Its orbit has an eccentricity of 0.13 and an inclination of 1° with respect to the ecliptic. The body's observation arc begins with its official discovery observation at Johannesburg in June 1935.

Naming 

This minor planet was named after Angola's city and chief port Benguela (São Felipe de Benguela), formerly spelled Benguella. The official  was published by the Minor Planet Center on 1 February 1980.

Physical characteristics 

Benguella spectral type is unknown, with no assumptions possible based on the asteroid's albedo (see below)

As of 2018, no rotational lightcurve of Benguella has been obtained from photometric observations. The body's rotation period, pole and shape remain unknown. According to the surveys carried out by the Infrared Astronomical Satellite IRAS, the Japanese Akari satellite and the NEOWISE mission of NASA's Wide-field Infrared Survey Explorer, Benguella measures between 10.48 and 16.68 kilometers in diameter and its surface has an albedo between 0.076 and 0.24.

References

External links 
 Dictionary of Minor Planet Names, Google books
 Discovery Circumstances: Numbered Minor Planets (1)-(5000) – Minor Planet Center
 
 

001784
Discoveries by Cyril Jackson (astronomer)
Named minor planets
19350630